North Tonawanda High School (NTHS) is a public high school located in North Tonawanda, New York. N.T.H.S. is the high school for the North Tonawanda City School District. The current principal is Bradley Rowles.

Academics

Academies 
North Tonawanda High School houses five smaller career academies: The Academy of Business and Finance, The Academy of Engineering & Architecture, the Academy of Information Technology, the Academy of International Studies, and the Academy of Health Science. Each academy accepts around twenty new students each school year, wherein each student takes a track of classes within that discipline to prepare students for further exploration of that career strand in college.

History 

North Tonawanda High School was built and opened in 1962.

Selected former principals 
Previous assignment and reason for departure denoted in parentheses
George L. Lowry–1927-1962 (Teacher - North Tonawanda High School, named Principal of North Tonawanda Junior High)
Earl Fonner–1962-1972 (Assistant Principal - North Tonawanda High School, retired)
B. Frank Sheppard–?-1979 (Assistant Principal - North Tonawanda Middle School, retired)
John T. Mahoney–1979-1987 (Principal - Perry Junior/Senior High School, resigned)
Joseph Burruano–1987-1990 (Principal - Payne Junior High School, retired)
Martin R. Heavey, Jr.–1990-1993 (House II Principal - Orchard Park High School, named Principal of Cleveland Hill High School)
Franklin D. Ruggiero–1993-1999 (Principal - Jefferson Middle School, died)
Albert J. Almansberger–1999-2005 (Principal - Keshequa Junior-Senior High School, retired)
James Fisher (retired 2022)

Notable alumni, teachers and coaches
Maryalice Demler, television news anchor
Tonio di Paolo, opera singer
Stan Rojek, baseball player
Roman Piskor, American football player
Earl Valiquette, Canadian football player

References

External links 
District Website

Public high schools in New York (state)
Schools in Niagara County, New York